Felindyffryn Halt was located on the Carmarthen to Aberystwyth Line, originally called the Manchester and Milford Railway, before being transferred to the Great Western Railway (GWR).

History
The station was opened in June 1935 by the GWR to serve the mill and the urban area. The station closed in December 1964 when services were truncated at Strata Florida, following flood damage by the River Ystwyth to the line one mile east of Llanilar. Formal closure was confirmed two months later. The halt was of a basic wooden platform construction with a simple shelter.

References
Notes

Sources

Further reading
 Holden, J.S. (1979, revised 2nd edition 2007): The Manchester & Milford Railway, Oakwood Press,

External links
 Video of the station

Disused railway stations in Ceredigion
Former Great Western Railway stations
Beeching closures in Wales
Railway stations in Great Britain opened in 1935
Railway stations in Great Britain closed in 1964